Artem Tsoglin (born November 1, 1997) is an Israeli pair skater. With his skating partner, Hailey Kops, he has competed in the final segment at two World Junior Championships (2017, 2018).

Personal life 
Tsoglin was born on November 1, 1997, in Kharkiv, Ukraine. He later moved to Kiryat Shmona, Israel.

Career

Single skating 
Tsoglin began learning to skate in 2004. He represented Israel in men's singles at two ISU Junior Grand Prix events, in 2014 and 2015. He was coached by Galit Chait Moracci and Roman Serov in Hackensack, New Jersey.

Pair skating 
In 2016, Tsoglin teamed up with Hailey Kops to compete for Israel in pair skating. The two made their international debut in September 2016, placing 9th at the ISU Junior Grand Prix in Russia. In March, the pair finished 11th at the 2017 World Junior Championships in Taipei, Taiwan.

Kops/Tsoglin placed 16th at the 2018 World Junior Championships in Sofia, Bulgaria. They were named in Israel's team for the 2019 European Championships in Minsk, Belarus.

Programs

Pairs with Kops

Men's singles

Competitive highlights 
CS: Challenger Series; JGP: Junior Grand Prix

Pairs with Kops

Men's singles

References

External links 
 

1997 births
Israeli male pair skaters
Israeli male single skaters
Living people
People from Kiryat Shmona
Sportspeople from Kharkiv
Ukrainian emigrants to Israel